Seedsman is the surname of the following people:
Bill Seedsman (1914–2001), Australian rules footballer 
Paul Seedsman (born 1992), Australian rules footballer 
Reg Seedsman (1895–1983), Australian rules footballer

See also
Mount Seedsman in Antarctica

English-language surnames